Ellen Berkenblit (born 1958) is an American painter. She was born in Paterson, New Jersey and graduated from the Cooper Union in 1980. She received an Arts and Letters grant from the American Academy of Arts and Letters in 2013, and a Guggenheim Fellowship in the following year. She has exhibited at the Anton Kern Gallery. The Brooklyn Museum holds examples of her work.

References

1958 births
American women painters
Artists from New York City
Cooper Union alumni
Living people
21st-century American women artists